The anime series The Story of Saiunkoku is based on the series of Japanese light novels written by Sai Yukino. Produced by Madhouse Studios and directed by Jun Shishido, the series premiered in Japan on NHK on April 8, 2006. The first season ran for 39 episodes until its conclusion on February 24, 2007. The series' second season, referred to as Saiunkoku Monogatari 2nd Series, premiered on April 7, 2007 and ran for another 39 episodes until its conclusion on March 8, 2008.

In May 2007, Geneon Entertainment announced it had acquired the licensed to releases the anime in North America with English language options. In September 2007, after only two volumes had been released, Geneon closed its North America operations. In July 2008, Funimation Entertainment announced that it will distribute several Geneon titles, including The Story of Saiunkoku.

The series uses three pieces of theme music. "Hajimari no kaze" by Ayaka Hirahara is used for the opening theme for both the first and second seasons. For the ending theme, "Saikou no Kataomoi" by Sachi Tainaka is used for the first season, while "Asu he" by Teruya Miho is used for the second season.

Episode listing

Season 1

Season 2

See also
 List of The Story of Saiunkoku characters

References

External links
Official NHK Story of Saiunkoku anime website  
Official Funimation Story of Saiunkoku anime website

Story of Saiunkoku